The Monitor may refer to:

Publications
 The Monitor: Or, British Freeholder, an 18th-century British periodical
 The Monitor (Kansas City), a free monthly newspaper distributed in the Kansas City Area
 The Monitor (Kirksville, MO), an alternative newspaper at Truman State University
 The Monitor (Montenegro), a news magazine published in Podgorica
 The Monitor (Montreal), a former community weekly paper in Montreal, now online only
 The Monitor (Sydney), a former biweekly newspaper in Sydney, New South Wales
 The Monitor (Texas), a newspaper covering the Rio Grande Valley
 The Monitor (Uganda), a national newspaper with its sister "Sunday Monitor"
 The Monitor, sometimes used as shorthand for the Christian Science Monitor

Other
 USS Monitor, the United States Navy's first ironclad warship
 The Monitor (comics), a DC Comics character from Crisis on Infinite Earths
 The Monitor (album), an album by the band Titus Andronicus
 The Monitor (film), the 2011 Norwegian film originally named Babycall

See also
The Monitors (disambiguation)
Monitor (disambiguation)